Ebony Forest Chamarel or just the "Ebony Forest" is a 50 ha conservation area for Mauritian endemic species with a rehabilitated indigenous forest (including rare semi-dry forest types), situated in Chamarel, in the south-west of Mauritius.

Establishment

It was established in June 2017, after 10 years of work in restoring the forests and planting 130,000 endemic species. In addition to the reintroduced species, the reserve is home to some of the few remaining stands of original mature endemic Ebony forest.

Facilities

The reserve has canopy walkways and view points, and also runs guided tours or safaris. There is a museum, restaurant and educational facilities on the reserve. 

It is located next to the "Seven Coloured Earths" site, in the Chamarel area in the south west of the island.

References

Tourist attractions in Mauritius
Geography of Mauritius
Environment of Mauritius
Protected areas of Mauritius